The Apple and the Tooth is an album by Bibio. It is his third album of 2009, and his second album on Warp Records. The release comprises four new tracks and eight remixes of tracks from Ambivalence Avenue. Remixers include Clark, Wax Stag, Eskmo, The Gentleman Losers, and Lone, as well as Bibio himself.

Track listing

External links 
 The Apple and the Tooth at the Warp Records website

References 

Bibio albums
2009 albums
Warp (record label) albums